Andrew I (died 28 June 1174), his Russian name in full, Andrey Yuryevich Bogolyubsky (lit. Andrey Yuryevich of Bogolyubovo), was Grand prince of Vladimir-Suzdal from 1157 until his death. Andrey accompanied Yuri I Vladimirovich (Yury Dolgoruky), his father, on a conquest of Kiev, then led the devastation of the same city in 1169, and oversaw the elevation of Vladimir as the new capital of northeastern Rus'. He was canonized as a saint in the Russian Orthodox Church in 1702.

Biography 
Andrey Bogolyubsky was born ca. 1111, to a daughter of Ayyub Khan, the Kipchak leader, and to Yuri I Vladimirovich, commonly known as Yuri Dolgoruki, a prince of the Rurik dynasty, who proclaimed Andrey a prince in Vyshgorod (near Kiev).

Andrey left Vyshgorod in 1155 and moved to Vladimir. After his father's death in 1157, he became Knyaz (prince) of Vladimir, Rostov and Suzdal. He proceeded to attempt to unite Rus' lands under his authority, struggling persistently for submission of Novgorod to his authority, and conducting a complex military and diplomatic game in South Rus'. In 1162, Andrey sent an embassy to Constantinople, lobbying for a separate metropolitan see in Vladimir. In 1169 his troops sacked Kiev, devastating it as never before. After plundering the city, stealing much religious artwork, which included the Byzantine "Mother of God" icon. Andrey appointed his brother Gleb as prince of Kiev, in an attempt to unify his lands with Kiev. Following his brother's death in 1171, Andrey became embroiled in a two-year war to maintain control over Kiev, which ended in his defeat.

Andrey established for himself the right to receive tribute from the populations of the Northern Dvina lands. As "ruler of all Suzdal land", Bogolyubsky transferred the capital to Vladimir, strengthened it, and constructed the Assumption Cathedral, the Church of the Intercession on the Nerl, and other churches and monasteries. Under his leadership Vladimir was much enlarged, and fortifications were built around the city.

During Andrey's reign, the Vladimir-Suzdal principality achieved significant power—he "made Vladimir the centre of the grand principality"—and it became the strongest among the Kievan Rus principalities. The expansion of his princely authority, and his conflicts with the upper nobility, the boyars, gave rise to a conspiracy that resulted in Bogolyubsky's death on the night of 28–29 June 1174, when twenty of them burst into his chambers and slew him in his bed. As the Encyclopædia Britannica notes, Andrey 
placed a series of his relatives on the now secondary princely throne of Kiev... [and later] compelled Novgorod to accept a prince of his choice. In governing his realm, [he] not only demanded that the subordinate princes obey him but also tried to reduce the traditional political powers of the boyars... within his hereditary lands. In response, his embittered courtiers formed a conspiracy and killed him.

Descendents
With his wife, Andrey Bogolyubsky had one son, Yury Bogolyubsky, who became the husband of Queen Tamar of Georgia.

Legacy

 The ancient icon, Theotokos of Bogolyubovo, was painted in the 12th century at the request of Andrey Bogolyubsky.
 Andrey had the castle, Bogolyubovo, built near Vladimir, and it would become his favorite residence and the source of his nickname, "Bogolyubsky".
 His victory over the Bulgars is remembered yearly during the Honey Feast of the Saviour.

See also
Andronikos I Komnenos

References

Further reading 

 Paszkiewicz. H. (1954). The Origin of Russia. Chicago: The University of Chicago Press.

External links
 Burial of St Andrew the Prince Orthodox icon and synaxarion

 

1110s births
1174 deaths
12th-century murdered monarchs
Eastern Orthodox royal saints
Grand Princes of Vladimir
Russian saints of the Eastern Orthodox Church
Rurik dynasty
Yurievichi family
Murdered Russian monarchs
Burials at Dormition Cathedral, Vladimir
People of Cuman descent